Lolly Wolly Doodle is an American company that manufactures women's and children's clothing for sale online. It was founded in 2008 in Lexington, North Carolina, and is now owned by investment firm Stage Fund. After investments by venture capitalists such as Revolution Growth, it expanded to include production facilities in New York City.

Lolly Wolly Doodle sells most of its products through its Facebook page. Frydenlund claims the company was once the largest business on that site. It is considered by some business journalists to have succeeded in using Facebook as a sales platform where larger, established retailers had failed.

The company takes a fast fashion approach to product development and production. Since it offers custom services like monogramming, it uses just-in-time production; its workers have been compared to short-order cooks. The network effects of distributing through a prominent social media site eliminate the need to spend money on marketing or advertising.

History

2006–08: eBay
Brandi Temple started the company in 2008. Frustrated with the styles of clothing on offer for young girls at retailers, and unwilling to pay higher prices to boutiques that sold what she was looking for, Temple began sewing clothes on her own for her daughters. Finding a large amount of fabric left over after one session, she decided to make more clothing in the same style and offer them for sale on eBay rather than let it go to waste. With the help of family and friends, it eventually grew into a regular business. "Within a matter of months, we had turned our bedroom and garage into a mini-factory," she writes on the company's website. She named it Lolly Wolly Doodle (LWD), a play on the children's song "Polly Wolly Doodle" that was her nickname for a niece of hers named Lolly. In 2008 the eBay store was bringing regular extra income into  Temple's household, and she formally incorporated Lolly Wolly Doodle.

2008–10: Move to Facebook
Two years later patterns were sent to a Chinese company for quality testing. The resulting dresses were below expectations, so they decided to post them on the company's Facebook page rather than their regular eBay store. The potential customers could leave a comment on the posting with their email address and LWD would send a PayPal invoice at a discounted price.

"I just snapped a picture and put it on Facebook," Temple told Bloomberg News in 2013, claiming they sold out within 30 seconds. That was more business in one day than they had done on eBay in a month. As a result, they moved the online store from eBay to Facebook. Her family continued helping her meet demand, with her father cooking meals and her husband learning to monogram

2010–12: Expansion

As the company's fortunes grew, Temple did not think she could handle the continued growth of the company and decided to sell it for a million dollars. Temple was introduced to a banker in Charlotte, who in turn put her in touch with Shana Fisher, a New York venture capitalist who had started her own firm, High Line Venture Partners, that had been an early funder of successful startups like MakerBot, Vine and Pinterest.

Fisher told Temple she had significantly undervalued LWD. Fisher believed it could be worth as much as $100 million. and then invested $100,000 and arranged a seed round of financing several months later that raised $1.4 million, enough for Fisher to move production from Temple's home into a  former tire warehouse in Lexington.

Now capitalized, Lolly Wolly Doodle was still short staffed and increased their staff nearly tenfold over the next two years.  In the executive suite, Emily Hickey, formerly of HotJobs, became LWD's chief operating officer. She  subsequently brought even more veterans of e-commerce into the company. Growth continued to the point that it was necessary to expand from the old tire warehouse to a  facility by September 2012.  By that time, the company had achieved 300,000 Facebook fans.

2013–2017: Revolution investment
Business and tech media began to take notice of not only Lolly Wolly Doodle's success but how it had accomplished it, succeeding on Facebook when larger, older companies like JCPenney had quietly withdrawn highly touted but unprofitable sales operations from the site during the same time LWD had taken off. Kara Swisher wrote about Temple and LWD a few months after the move. "Essentially, Temple is doing a modified version of a flash sale, but with just-in-time retail elements," she observed. At the beginning of 2013, Business Insider named Temple and Hicks to its list of "30 Startup People To Watch This Year." By the end of the year, the writers suggested, "we bet a lot more people will know about Temple and her company."

In June, that prediction was borne out when Steve Case, founder of America Online (AOL), invested $20 million in LWD through his venture capital firm, Revolution LLC. He called the company "a classic viral brand that resonated with its audience." He and another former AOL executive, Donn Young, took positions on LWD's board of directors. As Fisher's investment had two years earlier, the money primarily enabled an expansion to yet another larger production facility later that summer, this time a  building that had been vacant for many years. The company also released a mobile app and began selling its clothing through Instagram and Pinterest as well.

For that year the company's revenues were $11 million. By the time Inc. ran a cover story on Temple and Lolly Wolly Doodle in mid-2014, the company had grown to four facilities, including one in New York City that handled the company's technology, and 250 employees. It had 900,000 Facebook fans. The company's main project for the year was the coding and implementation of customized software to improve the structure of design and sales data and better integrate the supply chain, production and warehouse operations.

In September 2017 Lolly Wolly Doodle was purchased by Dan Frydenlund, chairman and CEO of the investment firm Stage Fund.

2018: Outsourcing
Lolly Wolly Doodle discontinued manufacturing in Lexington, NC and moved most of the manufacturing overseas, and moved operation to other US cities, including Atlanta.

Business model

While it sells product through several online channels, including its own website and other social networks, LWD by some estimates does 80% of its business through its Facebook page. Temple claims the company does more business on the site than any other, and no independent analysis has suggested otherwise. Its 900,000 fans are not the most of any retailer—Zappos counts 1.5 million—but are disproportionately large compared to its overall size. Since larger, established retailers have mostly been unable to generate significant sales from their Facebook presence, e-commerce analysts have studied Lolly Wolly Doodle's business model to understand how it has come to work.

Retailers such as JCPenney opened Facebook stores in 2010. The site provided an extra tab for users to click if they wanted to buy something. Sucharita Mulpuru, an analyst at Forrester Research likened this to "trying to sell stuff to people while they're hanging out with their friends at the bar." However, Inc. later noted, JCPenney, which quietly closed its Facebook store within a year and returned to simply using its page for marketing purposes, was in fact "[not] asking people to shop at the bar; it was asking people to leave the bar and go to another tab, whereas Temple was essentially setting up trunk shows in the bar."

Once the order is processed, the garment is actually manufactured. The company uses the just-in-time production method:

Donn Davis, a former America Online executive now on LWD's board, says that Temple has "reinvent[ed] apparel much as Dell reinvented the PC industry. It's affordable custom [manufacturing] in real time with little inventory risk."

The real advantage to LWD from Facebook, analysts believe, is not in order processing or production, although those do benefit from the use of the site. Instead it is the effects of the social feedback loop it creates on the company's marketing and inventory management, a practice that dates to the company's origins as Temple's hobby. When she first started selling on Facebook, she focused less on growing sales and more on building relationships with her customers that included listening to them closely about what they wanted. This, Inc. says, "eliminated much of the guesswork of merchandising." According to Temple, "[w]hen something went crazy, I would go really deep into that style and those colors," she says. "And if it didn't [sell], then forget it. I didn't make it again. We would fill whatever orders we got and move on to something else." This practice continues today.

This almost-instant feedback eliminates the need for the company to spend money on market research. "You're able to see what sells, why it sells, hear directly from [customers] and engage with them," Temple told Bloomberg News in 2013. New designs that sell quickly are moved into larger-scale production and displayed on the company's website, with pre-customized versions of proven long-term successes outsourced to plants in China and Latin America. This, the company's only overseas production, accounts for 30% of its output. It is unlikely to increase as the company's success has resulted from being close to its primary market. 

As a result of this feedback loop and short supply chain, LWD does not have the overstock problems that beset larger, traditional clothing retailers, with accumulations of unsold product on shelves and in warehouses. While warning that LWD's system isn't perfect—"[t]here are all kinds of early demand indicators that could be wrong"—Mulpuru sees much upside. "[Y]our chances of picking a hit are going to be better, and you will have fewer markdowns."

The experience also informs future design choices, making the company smarter. "We don't plan two seasons ahead," Temple says. It also limits the possible variations it might make on an item—a "pod", in company parlance—to keep manufacturing complexity down. Hicks, Temple's chief operating officer, says this puts the company alongside European fast fashion successes like H&M and Zara.

Davis believes LWD's business model can be applied to many other products besides children's clothing. Other companies have begun to imitate LWD's business model, such as Combatant Gentleman, whose business clothing for young men has found a Facebook following. A San Francisco startup called Soldsie, whose founder was inspired by Temple and Lolly Wolly Doodle, does over a million dollars worth of transactions each month for similarly small businesses online.

Outside observers have praised what Temple and LWD have done.Will Young, the director of Zappos Labs, told Inc. "[They have] been able to do something that no big brand has been able to do, which is to convince people to actually buy on Facebook." 

There have been some reservations expressed, however. Bloomberg notes that it works because "sales have been small enough to manage through the comment section on posts, and supply is limited, prompting users to act fast to snap up available inventory." Temple suggests that it has worked due to LWD's "relatively modest" scale. The company's requirement that customers post their email addresses in comments to order "could invite inappropriate use of the information."

Brands

The company uses the Lolly Wolly Doodle name for most of its lines. For girls, it makes primarily dresses and capri sets, with a few swimwear pieces. Boys' clothing from LWD is primarily shortalls, T-shirt sets and bathing trunks. An extensive babywear line is complemented with tops, skirts and dresses (primarily maxi length) for adult women.

The only other label LWD puts out is Designed by Me, for customized clothing. Users of the website choose details of a girls' dress; it is then made and shipped to them within three weeks. A Facebook login is required.

See also

List of companies of the United States by state#North Carolina

References

External links
Company website

Online clothing retailers of the United States
Children's clothing retailers
Children's clothing brands
Manufacturing companies based in North Carolina
American companies established in 2008
Clothing companies established in 2008
Retail companies established in 2008
Davidson County, North Carolina
2008 establishments in the United States
2008 establishments in North Carolina